Uladzimir Marhulets (born 15 January 1984) is a retired Belarusian professional footballer.

External links

1984 births
Living people
Belarusian footballers
FC Smorgon players
FC Granit Mikashevichi players
FC SKVICH Minsk players
FC Dinamo-Juni Minsk players
FC Slonim-2017 players
FC Isloch Minsk Raion players
FC Dinamo Minsk players
Association football midfielders